Eunidia argentea is a species of beetle in the family Cerambycidae. It was described by Jérôme Sudre and Pierre Téocchi in 2002.

References

Eunidiini
Beetles described in 2002